Girl and the River is a 1958 French drama film directed by François Villiers. It was entered into the 1958 Cannes Film Festival.

Cast
In alphabetical order
 Henri Arius - The uncle from Cavaillon
 Pascale Audret - Hortense
 Odette Barencey - Joséphine
 Charles Blavette - L'oncle Simon
 Jean Clarens - Le notaire
 Andrée Debar - The cousin from Rochebrune
 Hubert de Lapparent - Elie, a peasant
 Hélène Gerber - La femme d'Elie
 Jean Giono - Le récitant (voice)
 Harry-Max - Le juge de paix
 Germaine Kerjean - The aunt from Rochebrune
 Robert Lombard - Le cousin de Rochebrune
 Milly Mathis - The aunt from Cavaillon
 Pierre Moncorbier - L'oncle vigneron
 Jean Panisse - The butcher
 Maurice Sarfati - The cousin from Cavaillon
 Dany Saval
 Jean-Marie Serreau - Le Jéhovah de Perthuis
 Madeleine Sylvain - La bouchère
 Arlette Thomas - La femme de Dabisse

References

External links

1958 films
1950s French-language films
1958 drama films
Films based on works by Jean Giono
Films directed by François Villiers
French drama films
1950s French films